Kim Young-kwang (born January 11, 1987) is a South Korean actor and model. Kim began his career as a model and has modeled for designers such as Alexander McQueen, Vivienne Westwood and Etro. In 2008, he was the first Asian model to model at Dior Homme's show. As an actor, Kim has starred in the films Runway Cop (2012), Hot Young Bloods (2014), On Your Wedding Day (2018) and The Soul-Mate (2018), as well as the television dramas Pinocchio (2014), D-Day (2015), Sweet Stranger and Me (2016), The Guardians (2017), and The Secret Life of My Secretary (2019).

Life and career

Beginnings
Born as Kim Young-kwang, Kim's father was a veteran of the Vietnam War and died when Kim was in elementary school.

Acting
Kim began acting in 2008, and later performed in the drama Good Doctor on KBS2.

Kim also starred in the action comedy, Runway Cop (2012) and teen romance drama, Hot Young Bloods (2014).

In 2014 he performed in dramas such as tvN's Plus Nine Boys and SBS's Pinocchio, for which he received a SBS Drama Award as "New Star" for his role as Seo Beom-jo.

In 2015, he starred in the medical drama D-Day, and in the web drama Dr. Ian with Sandara Park.

In 2016, he was cast as the lead in the web drama Gogh, The Starry Night with Kwon Yuri, and in the KBS2 romantic comedy series Sweet Stranger and Me with Soo Ae.

In 2017, he starred in the MBC thriller drama The Guardians as a passionate prosecutor.

In 2018, Kim starred in romance film On Your Wedding Day opposite Park Bo-young. His performance in the film earned him a Best New Actor award in film at the Baeksang Arts Awards. He then starred in fantasy comedy film The Soul-Mate together with Ma Dong-seok. Later that year, he was also cast in tvN's mystery drama Room No. 9.

In 2019, Kim starred in the romance comedy drama The Secret Life of My Secretary, which premiered in May 2019. 

In 2021, he starred in the spy action film  Mission: Possible opposite Lee Sun-bin, which was released in February.

Also in 2021, he starred alongside Choi Kang-hee in the fantasy romantic comedy Hello, Me!, which premiered in February 2021.

In 2022, he starred in murder thriller netflix series Somebody.

Personal life
Kim maintains a close friendship with Lee Soo-hyuk, as well as other fellow models-turned-actors: Kim Woo-bin, Hong Jong-hyun and Sung Joon – with whom he has worked onscreen in White Christmas. They were given the nickname of "Model Avengers" by their fans.

On December 12, 2013, Kim began his mandatory military service. However, he was only required to be enlisted for six months as a public service soldier due to his father being a Vietnam War veteran, as well as an acknowledged person of national merit. Kim was discharged in June 2014.

Filmography

Film

Television series

Web series

Television shows

Music video

Theater

Discography

Soundtrack appearances

Awards and nominations

References

External links
 
 
 
 

1987 births
21st-century South Korean male actors
South Korean male television actors
South Korean male film actors
South Korean male stage actors
South Korean male models
South Korean male web series actors
Hanyang University alumni
People from Incheon
Living people
Best New Actor Paeksang Arts Award (film) winners